The Organization of African Instituted Churches (OAIC) is a Christian ecumenical organization founded in 1978. It is a member of the World Council of Churches. It describes itself as "the representative body that brings together African Independent and Instituted Churches (AICs), offers them a forum for sharing their concerns and hopes, and enables churches to minister effectively to the needs of their members and their communities."

References

External links  
Official website
World Council of Churches listing

Christian organizations established in 1978
Members of the World Council of Churches
Christian organizations based in Africa
Regional councils of churches